Kim Su-yeon or Kim Su-yŏn may refer to:
Kim Soo-yeon (born 1983), South Korean male footballer
Kim Soo-yun (born 1989), South Korean female footballer
Kim Su-yeon (born 2001), South Korean figure skater
Kim Su-yeon (handballer) (born 1998), South Korean handballer